Cesar Andrade is a Brazilian professional vert skater. Andrade started skating when he was 15 in 1994 and turned professional in 2002. Andrade has attended many competitions in his vert skating career.

Best Tricks Double Backflip 180

Vert Competitions  
2002 Latin American X Games Medalists

References

External links
skatelog.com
rollernews.com
kiaxgamesasia.com
actionsportstour.com
espneventmedia.com

Vert skaters
1979 births
Living people
X Games athletes
Sportspeople from São Paulo